Gol Tappeh is a village in Dizajrud-e Gharbi Rural District, in the Central District of Ajab Shir County, East Azerbaijan Province, Iran. At the 2006 census, its population was 1,549, in 339 families.

References 

Populated places in Ajab Shir County